The art of the Upper Paleolithic represents the oldest form of prehistoric art. Figurative art is present in Europe and Southeast Asia, beginning between about 40,000 to 35,000 years ago. Non-figurative cave paintings, consisting of hand stencils and simple geometric shapes, are somewhat older, at least 40,000 years old, and possibly as old as 64,000 years. This latter estimate is due to a controversial 2018 study based on uranium-thorium dating, which would imply Neanderthal authorship and qualify as art of the Middle Paleolithic.

The emergence of figurative art has been interpreted as reflecting the emergence of full behavioral modernity, and is part of the defining characteristics separating the Upper Paleolithic from the Middle Paleolithic. The discovery of cave art of comparable age to the oldest European samples in Indonesia has established that similar artistic traditions existed both in eastern and in western Eurasia 40,000 years ago. This has been taken to suggest an artistic tradition dating to more than 50,000 years ago, spread along the southern coast of Eurasia in the original coastal migration movement. In 2018, the discovery of a figurative painting of an unknown animal was announced; it was over 40,000 years old, and was found in a cave on the Indonesian island of Borneo. In July 2021, scientists reported the discovery of a bone carving, one of the world's oldest works of art, made by Neanderthals about 51,000 years ago.

European Upper Paleolithic art is known informally as "Ice Age art", in reference to the last glacial period.

Europe 

Art of the European Upper Paleolithic  includes rock and cave painting, jewelry, drawing, carving, engraving and sculpture in clay, bone, antler, stone and ivory, such as the Venus figurines, and musical instruments such as flutes.
Decoration was also made on functional tools, such as spear throwers, perforated batons and lamps.
Engravings on flat pieces of stones are found in considerable numbers (up to 5,000 at one Spanish site) at sites with the appropriate geology, with the marks sometimes so shallow and faint that the technique involved is closer to drawing – many of these were not spotted by the earliest excavators, and found by later teams in spoil heaps. Painted plaques are less common. It is possible that they were used in rituals, or alternatively heated on a fire and wrapped as personal warmers. Either type of use may account for the many broken examples, often with the fragments dispersed over some distance (up to 30 metres apart at Gönnersdorf).  Many sites have large quantities of flat stones apparently used as flooring, with only a minority decorated.

Some of the oldest works of art were found in the Swabian Jura, in Baden-Württemberg, Germany. The Venus figurine known as the Venus of Hohle Fels and the Löwenmensch (Lion-Human) statuette of Hohlenstein-Stadel both date to approximately 40,000 years ago. The so-called Adorant from the Geißenklösterle cave dates to about the same time.

There are numerous carved or engraved pieces of bone and ivory, such as the Swimming Reindeer found in France from the Magdalenian period. These include spear throwers, including one shaped like a mammoth, and many of the type of objects called a bâton de commandement. 

The animals depicted are prey sought by the Paleolithic hunters,
such as reindeer,
horses,
bisons, 
mammoth, 
the woolly rhinoceros, 
and birds,  
as well as apex predators such as 
lions panthers or leopards, 
hyenas and bears.

The human form was represented comparatively rarely (relative to the depiction of animals); 
most notable are the Venus figurines (representation of the female form, emphasizing breasts and/or buttocks). The Lion-Human statuette of Hohlenstein-Stadel (Aurignacian) is a hybrid creature with a lion's head on a human body. Other possible hybrid figures are the Shaman of Trois-Frères and a "Bison-man" from the same cave system, another "Bison-man" from the Grotte de Gabillou in the Dordogne, and what might be a bird-headed man in the "Shaft of the Dead Man" in the Lascaux caves.
Representation of males are rare prior to incipient Mesolithic.
Mesolithic examples include the "Pin Hole man" of Creswell Crags, Derbyshire.

There is evidence for some craft specialization, and the transport over considerable distances of materials such as stone and, above all marine shells, much used for jewellery and probably decorating clothes. Shells from Mediterranean species have been found at Gönnersdorf, over 1,000 kilometres from the Mediterranean coast. The higher sea levels today mean that the level and nature of coastal settlements in the Upper Paleolithic are now submerged and remain unknown.

Asia 

Cave paintings from the Indonesian island of Sulawesi are situated in the Caves in the district of Maros were dated based on Uranium–thorium dating in a 2014 study. The oldest dated image was a hand stencil, given a minimum age of 39,900 years. A painting of a babirusa was dated to at least 35.4 ka, placing it among the oldest known figurative depictions worldwide.

A cave at Turobong in South Korea containing human remains has been found to contain carved deer bones and depictions of deer that may be as much as 40,000 years old. Petroglyphs of deer or reindeer found at Sokchang-ri may also date to the Upper Paleolithic. Potsherds in a style reminiscent of early Japanese work have been found at Kosan-ri on Jeju island, which, due to lower sea levels at the time, would have been accessible from Japan.

In November 2018, scientists reported the discovery of the oldest known figurative art painting, over 40,000 (perhaps as old as 52,000) years old, of an unknown animal, in the cave of Lubang Jeriji Saléh on the Indonesian island of Borneo.

Some Upper Paleolithic artifacts such as the Venus figurines of Mal'ta were found in Southern Siberia, Russia. These figures consist most often of ivory. The figures are about 20,000 years old and stem from the Gravettian. Most of these statuettes show stylized clothes. Quite often the face is depicted. They were discovered at Mal'ta, at the Angara River, near Lake Baikal in Irkutsk Oblast, Siberia.

The Bhimbetka rock shelters have are linear representations in green of humans dancing and hunting.

Australia 

Gabarnmung, or Nawarla Gabarnmung, is an Aboriginal archaeological and rock art site in south-western Arnhem Land, in the Top End of Australia's Northern Territory. The rock shelter features prehistoric paintings of fish, including the barramundi, wallabies, crocodiles, people and spiritual figures. Most of the paintings are located on the shelter's ceiling, but many are found on the walls and pillars of the site. 
The painting on the ceiling has been securely dated to before 27,000 years ago.

Radiocarbon dating of charcoal excavated from the base of the lowest stratigraphic layer of the floor returned a mean age of  suggesting the oldest date for the earliest human habitation. Faceted and use-striated hematite crayons have been recovered from nearby locations (Malakunanja II and Nauwalabila 1) in strata dated from 45,000 to 60,000 years old which suggests that the Gabarnmung shelter may have been decorated from its inception.

The Gwion Gwion rock paintings are a unique form of rock art found in Western Australia. They are predominantly human figures drawn in fine detail with accurate anatomical proportioning. They have been dated at over 17,000 years old.

Near East and North Africa

Upper Paleolithic sites of the Near East, such as the Hayonim Cave, a cave located in a limestone bluff about 250 meters above modern sea level, in the Upper Galilee, Israel, have wall carvings depicting symbolic shapes and animals, such a running horse dated to the Levantine Aurignacian circa 28000 BP, and visible in the Israel Museum. This is considered as the first art object found within the context of the Levantine Upper Paleolithic.

Petroglyphs of the North African Mesolithic, such as those at Tassili n'Ajjer, Algeria, are dated to about 12,000 to 10,000 years old.

Sub-Saharan Africa 

The oldest known figurative art from Sub-Saharan Africa are seven stone plaquettes painted with figures of animals  found at the Apollo 11 Cave complex in Namibia, and dated to between 27,500 and 22,500 years ago.
There is a substantial amount of rock art attributable to the Bushmen (San) found throughout Southern Africa. 
Much of this art is recent (as evident from the subject matter depicted, including depictions of wagons and of European settlers wearing hats), but the oldest samples have been tentatively dated to as early as 26,000 years ago.

Matobo National Park, Zimbabwe, has many rock paintings. The oldest examples to 7,000 years ago, possibly as early as 13,000 years ago, while  the bulk were likely produced between c. 1,700 and 1,500 years ago.

Petroglyphs in West Africa, such as those of Bidzar, Cameroon, are dated to after 3,000 years ago.

Americas 
Rock paintings in the  Toquepala Caves in southern Peru are dated at ca. 11,500 years ago.  Some of the  paintings are figurative, notably including a scene of armed men hunting  guanaco cameloids.   The men are in a posture of attacking the animals with axe, lances, and spear throwers (but not including bow and arrow). The paintings are polychrome, with red made from hematite being the dominant color.

Rock art made by the earliest inhabitants of the Amazon region dates to between 11,800 and 12,600 years ago. The animals depicted include some now extinct, such as mastodons and giant sloths.

Early burial sites in Peru, such as the one at Telarmachay dating from about 10 ka onward, contained evidence of ritual burial, with deposits of red ocher and bead necklaces marking the site.

See also 
 Cave painting
 Cro-Magnon
 Kapova Cave
 List of Stone Age art
 Mask of la Roche-Cotard

Notes

References

Further reading

External links 
 
 EuroPreArt Database of European Prehistoric Art
 Human Timeline (Interactive) – Smithsonian, National Museum of Natural History (August 2016).
Image Database Paleolithic art in Northern Spain

 
Upper Paleolithic
Upper Paleolithic